was a Japanese samurai of the Azuchi-Momoyama period through early Edo period. The son of Katakura Kagetsuna, Shigenaga was the second man to bear the common name Kojūrō. His name was originally Shigetsuna; however, to avoid conflict with the fourth shōgun Ietsuna's name, he changed it to Shigenaga. 

In 1614, he took part in the Osaka Campaign, fighting Gotō Matabei at Dōmyōji Temple.

Following the Osaka Campaign, Shigenaga married a daughter of Sanada Yukimura and his wife, Chikurin-in (Ōtani Yoshitsugu's daughter and adopted daughter of Toyotomi Hideyoshi), and adopted their second son, Sanada Daihachi, later known as "Katakura Heinosuke Morinobu". He also assisted many of the masterless former Sanada retainers. 

He was succeeded by his maternal grandson also adopted son, Kagenaga.

Family
 Father: Katakura Kagetsuna
 Mother: Yanouchi Shigesada's daughter
 Wives:
 Haryu Aya
Sanada Ume (1604-1681)
 Daughter: Kisa married Matsumae Yasuhiro
 Adopted Sons:
 (Matsumae) Katakura Kagenaga (2nd)
 Katakura (Sanada) Morinobu (1612-1670)
 Katakura (Moniwa) Nobuyuki

Notes

1585 births
1659 deaths
Samurai
Karō
Katakura clan
Date retainers